Silasindurighopa is a Mouza under greater Guwahati city.

Villages in Kamrup Metropolitan district